Robert Underwood Johnson (January 12, 1853 – October 14, 1937) was an American writer, poet, and diplomat.

Biography
Robert Underwood Johnson was born in Centerville, Indiana, on  January 12, 1853. His brother Henry Underwood Johnson became a member of Congress from that district (1881-1889). His father, Nimrod Hoge Johnson was a lawyer and judge. His mother, Catherine Coyle Underwood was a suffragette. He was schooled in Calvinist Presbyterianism by his uncle by marriage, the Reverend Charles H. Raymond, who served as chargé d’affaires of the Republic of Texas at Washington before its admission as a state of the Union and by Quakerism of the Johnsons.

He attended the Quaker Earlham College in Richmond, Indiana, beginning at age fourteen and graduated with a B.S. in 1871. Johnson’s first work was as a clerk in Chicago, Illinois, agency of the educational books of Charles Scribner’s Sons, and in 1873 he entered the firm’s New York office, beginning his long connection with The Century Magazine, then Scribner’s Monthly, under Josiah Gilbert Holland. The Century Magazine was directed at leaders in the political, religious, artistic, and social opinion circles.  One of his first major projects for Scribner's was the editing of “Century War Series” (1883) and the subsequent four volumes Battles and Leaders of the Civil War (1887–88), with the goal of raising circulation (by 100,000), was a series on the great battles of the Civil War from the point of view of officers on both sides based on accounts sourced from soldiers’ family records. Johnson succeeded in securing four papers from General Ulysses S. Grant which later formed the basis of Grant’s Memoirs.

He married Katharine McMahon on August 31, 1876, in Washington, DC. They had a son, Owen McMahon Johnson (1878–1952), who became an American writer in his own right, and a daughter, Agnes McMahon Johnson (1880–1968). After their honeymoon that included attendance at the Philadelphia Exhibition, the couple relocated to the Murray Hill neighborhood in New York City. While in New York City, Johnson's love of nature and exploration extended to outings and ramblings. He was surrounded by social friends over for musical and literary evenings and consumed all forms of art, including opera and theater. His friends from the US and abroad included Tommaso Salvini, Paderewski, the Clemenses, Kipling and Eleonora Duse. By the 1890s, Johnson and his wife became friends with the inventor Nikola Tesla, for whom Johnson wrote a poem. He also collaborated with Tesla transliterating Serbian poems by Jovan Jovanović Zmaj in The Century Magazine.

International copyright
Johnson was a proponent of the establishment of international copyright protections. As secretary of the American Copyright League, he helped get the Law of 1891 passed, for which he was decorated by the French and Italian governments. The silver fruit stand honoring his role is in the collection of the Academy of Arts & Letters.  Johnson’s role in the creation, initial passage, and reauthorization of the act to end intellectual piracy in the US ranged from his position at The Century, as an officer of the Copyright League, lobbying Members of Congress, participation in a conference to secure support from labor unions, negotiating with the Congressional conference committee. Johnson was called the father of international copyright law.

Land preservation 
Johnson advocated for the forest reservation system and a scientific national policy of conservation. In 1889, camping out with naturalist John Muir at Soda Springs, Johnson encouraged Muir to "start an association" to help protect the Sierra Nevada, inspiring the formation of the Sierra Club in 1892.

Leveraging the influence of The Century, in conjunction with  Muir, Johnson was one of the driving forces behind the creation of Yosemite National Park in California in 1890 and in 1913. He served as chairman of a national commission for the preservation of that area and is credited with writing the bill. Muir dedicated his book The Yosemite to Johnson.

Johnson also fought persistently though vainly against the acquisition by the city of San Francisco, California, of the Hetch-Hetchy Valley as a reservoir. In 1906, in letters to President Theodore Roosevelt, he proposed a conference of governors to conserve the forests of the Eastern states, out of which grew the White House Conference on Conservation.

In 2017, a plaque commemorating Johnson’s role in relationship with Muir was erected at Tuolome Meadows – the site where Johnson and Muir held their conversation about land preservation in 1889. Their story was recounted in Ken Burns’s public television series on Our National Parks.

Hall of Fame and American Academy of Arts and Letters

As a founding director of the Hall of Fame of New York University, he helped shape its principles “to instill in both Americans and foreigners, and especially in the youth, the principle of patriotism, a healthy conservatism, and reverence for the traditions of high achievement”  along with “respect for scholarship and at the best traditions and standards; secondly, maintenance of the dignity and insistence on the value of literature and the arts; and thirdly, realization that its authority mush rest on the experience and the achievement of its members.” (RY) 
He became permanent secretary of the American Academy of Arts and Letters whose formation started in 1899 with Johnson successfully proposing the charter from Congress (1916), purchase of the Venetian Renaissance home on 155th Street, NYC, and the raising of funds for an endowment noting the indebtedness to the ‘finest Spanish scholar in America, Archer M. Huntington’  and culminating in 1904 (?). The first members to be inducted by secret ballot of their peers were William Dean Howells, Augustus Saint-Gaudens, Edmund Clarence Stedman, John La Farge, Mark Twain, John Hay and Edward MacDowell. The second group inducted at the first meeting were Henry James, Charles Follen McKim, Henry Adams, Charles Eliot Norton, John Quincy Adams Ward, Thomas Raynesford Lounsbury, Theodore Roosevelt, and Thomas Bailey Aldrich. A core of fifty members was inducted and in 1908 adopted a constitution.

“The value of a great institution, like the value of a great personality, lies in the potentiality of its influence.  Our national ideas need to be firmly established and maintained on an intellectual plane.  ….we also need a revival of the gospel that the glory of man is his mind and his soul; and to remember that these, as well as the body, are exposed to starvation and dwarfism and disease and blindness.  …”

•	In his book entitled Remembered Yesterdays: “The Temple” RUG poem at the laying for the cornerstone of the Academy’s permanent home.  Page 439 is an accounting of the history of the Academy.  Said by John Hay” an Academy was more needed in our democracy than in an old-world monarchy, which has its own traditions and inherited standards since here we are more subject to the tyranny of vogue.” 
As Secretary of the American Committee, he was a driving force for the effort to acquire and preserve as the Keats-Shelley museum from a museum the rooms in Rome on Spanish Steps leading up to the Santa Trinita dei Monti church where the poet John Keats and his friend Joseph Severn spent Keats's final months in 1821.  Percy Shelley apparently resided temporarily in a home across the steps.

Ambassador to Italy
Johnson served as the U.S. Ambassador to Italy from April 1920 to July 1921, and represented the United States as observer at the San Remo conference of the Supreme Council of the League. He was decorated by the Italian government in recognition of his work in behalf of good relations between Italy and the United States.

In 1916 he acted as pallbearer for the funeral of Alexander Wilson Drake, director of the Century Magazine art department and a notable engraver from New Jersey.

Johnson’s activities during World War I afforded him the opportunity to “present the little-known facts of Italy’s important contributions to the Allied cause, and that in general I had written much in prose and verse in admiration of that country and her people.” In 1917 he organized and was chairman of the American Poets' Ambulances in Italy. This organization presented 112 ambulances and 37 field hospitals to the Italian army in four months built from Ford chassis from Milan. In 1918–19 he was president of the New York Committee of the Italian War Relief Fund of America and raised $235,000 which was distributed all over Italy “not merely to minister to the suffering but to show Italians everywhere the sympathy and cooperation of America…the blind, prevention or cure of tuberculosis among children of veterans, benevolent work of San Gregorio in Rome.” After being shown a photograph of a child holding ‘the only doll in the valley’ he wrote a poem by that name, sent out a press appeal and ‘hundreds of dolls’ were distributed to the Val.” He served as the U.S. Ambassador to Italy from April 1920 to July 1921, and represented the United States as observer at the San Remo conference of the Supreme Council of the League. He was decorated by the Italian government in recognition of his work in behalf of good relations between Italy and the United States.

In his first week on the job, represented the United States as observer at the San Remo conference of the Supreme Council of the League (1920.) In his biography, he describes in some detail bemoaning the lack of an official record of the proceedings or decisions despite momentous topics such as Armenia, status of Constantinople, Yugoslavia, borders and troop positions in Italy, Germany as well as Palestine and the Zionists.  “It is amazing how frequently Italy seemed to be in the throes of an inescapable crisis, which, however, passed by like a summer storm – much noise and turmoil but little damage.”  Informed by his research into the Civil War, he visited the lower Alps battle fields. His duties were largely socially diplomatic but also included conversations with American business interested in working in Italy including Charles M. Schwab as well as a persistent opposition to Soviet intrusions of any kind.  A detailed description of the Celebration of Vittorio Veneto – enemy losses topped 500,000.  A description of hosting a dinner for the King and Queen of Denmark is rich in description of rituals, atmosphere and attire.   Zeppelin Roma purchased by the US, extensive description of two trips.  He, and apparently many in the diplomatic corps, operated independently receiving little operational funding or response to their queries from the US State Department.  He was decorated by the Italian government in recognition of his work in behalf of good relations between Italy and the United States.

Honors
For his service in securing an international copyright, he received the honorary A.M. degree from Yale University, the decoration of chevalier in the French Legion of Honor in 1891 and the cavaliers of the Crown of Italy in 1895.  In addition, Johnson was made a commander of the Order of the Crown of Italy in 1919, an officer of the Order of Leopold II (Belgium) in 1919, and the commander of the Order of St. Sava (Serbian) in 1920.  He received the Grand Cordon Order of SS.Maurice and Lazarus (Italian), conferred by King Victor Emanuel III in 1921; was named grand officer of the French Legion of Honor in 1922; and received the grand cordon, with star, order of Polonia Restituta in 1931.
A member of Phi Beta Kappa, he was also an organizer in 1904 and permanent secretary of the American Academy of Arts and Letters, an outgrowth of the National Institute of Arts and Letters, of which he had also been secretary.  He was a member of the National Citizens Committee of the Third Hague Conference, Independence Hall Conference to found the League to Enforce Peace, National Association of American Speech, Civil Service Reform Association, Sons of the Revolution, and the Authors, MacDowell (honorary), Century and Sierra clubs.

Writings
with Clarence Clough Buel, Battles and Leaders of the Civil War (1887–88)
The Winter Hour and Other Poems (New York: The Century, 1892).
Songs of Liberty and Other Poems (New York: The Century, 1897).
Poems (New York: The Century, 1902).
Saint Gaudens: An Ode (New York: The Century Co.,third edition, 1910)
Saint Gaudens: An Ode and Other Poems (Indianapolis and New York: The Bobbs-Merrill Col,fourth edition, 1914)
Poems of War and Peace (Indianapolis and New York: The Bobbs-Merrill Co., 1916)
Italian Rhapsody and Other Poems of Italy (Published: By The Author, 745 Fifth Avenue, NY, 1917)
Collected Poems, 1881–1919 (New Haven: Yale University, 1920).
 "Collected Poems, 1881-1992" (New Haven: Yale University, 1923)
Remembered Yesterdays (Boston: Little, Brown, 1923).
Your Hall of Fame: Being an Account of the Origin, Establishment, and History of This Division of New York University, from 1900 to 1935 inclusive (New York: New York University, 1935).
 "Poems of the Longer Flight" (Published: By The Author, 26 East 55th Street, NY, 1928)
 "The Pact and Honor and Other Poems" (Published: By The Author, 1929)
 "Poems of the Lighter Touch" (1930)
 "Poems of Fifty Years" (Published: By The Author, 26 East 55th Street, NY, 1931)
 "Aftermath" (Published: By The Author, NY 745 Fifth Avenue,1933)
 "Heroes, Children and Fun" (Published: By The Author,1934)

References

External links

Guide to the Robert Underwood Johnson papers at The Bancroft Library
Guide to the Robert Underwood Johnson papers at New York Public Library
Finding aid to Robert Underwood Johnson papers at Columbia University. Rare Book & Manuscript Library.
March 19, 1916, New York Times, Says “Vers Libre” Is Prose, Not Poetry; Robert Underwood Johnson Deplores Excesses of Ultra-Modern Writers in Rebellion Against What They Call Tyranny of Form

19th-century American historians
American male journalists
19th-century American poets
American male poets
Sierra Club people
Journalists from Washington, D.C.
1853 births
1937 deaths
20th-century American poets
19th-century American male writers
20th-century American male writers
20th-century American non-fiction writers
20th-century American diplomats
Earlham College alumni